Gamez or Gámez may refer to:

People
Ana Patricia Gámez (born 1987), Mexican beauty queen
Blanca Amelia Gámez (born 1950), Mexican politician
Celia Gámez (1905–1992), Argentine actress and dancer
Eduardo Gámez (born 1991), professional Mexican footballer
Elisbet Gámez (born 1997), Cuban swimmer
Enrique Gámez (born 1981), Ecuadorian footballer
Fran Gámez (born 1991), Spanish footballer
Francisca Rubio Gámez (born 1949), aka Fanny Rubio, Spanish professor and writer
 (1943–1984), Peruvian professor and founder of SUTEP
Jesús Gámez (born 1985), Spanish professional footballer
José Luis Íñiguez Gámez (born 1978), a Mexican politician from the National Action Party
Juan de Alfaro y Gamez (1610–1680), Spanish Baroque painter
Juan José Gámez (1939–1997), Costa Rican football player and manager
Julio César Gámez Interiano (born 1955), Honduran politician
Leo Gamez, Silvio Rafael Gamez, (born 1963), Venezuelan boxer
Máximo Gámez (born 1989), Nicaraguan professional defender
Melany Bergés Gámez (born 1990), blind Spanish Paralympic athlete
Miguel Ángel Gámez (born 1954), Honduran politician
Oscar Serrano-Gamez or Óscar Serrano (tennis) (born 1978), former Spanish professional male tennis player
Rafael Muino Gamez (born 1975), Spanish wheelchair basketball player
Robert Gamez (born 1968), American professional golfer
Roberto Gámez Panchamé (born 1950), Honduran veterinarian and politician
Victoria Gamez (1923–2005), Spanish operatic lyric soprano and recitalist

Other uses
Gamez Publishing, an international online network covering video games on consoles, PC and mobile
Gamez (illegal distribution), pirated games
Video games (misspelling)